Giorgio Achterberg (born 1 February 1990) is a Dutch footballer who plays for RKAVV.

Club career
Born in The Hague, Achterberg started playing football at a young age for local side VCS before joining the Ajax youth academy in 1998. Due to issues with transportation, he started playing in the youth academy for hometown club ADO Den Haag after only one season with the Amsterdam club. Achterberg made his professional debut for ADO Den Haag against VVV Venlo.

In June 2011, he was sent on a one year-loan to FC Dordrecht. and later moved to amateur side Scheveningen.

In summer 2014 he left Scheveningen for fellow amateurs Haaglandia but broke his calf in September 2014 to put him out for months.

References

External links
 Profile - Voetbal International

1990 births
Living people
Footballers from The Hague
Association football midfielders
Dutch footballers
AFC Ajax players
ADO Den Haag players
FC Dordrecht players
SVV Scheveningen players
Haaglandia players
VV Katwijk players
Eredivisie players
Eerste Divisie players
Derde Divisie players